Aisuluu Tynybekova (born 4 May 1993 in Bishkek) is a Kyrgyz freestyle wrestler. She won the silver medal in the women's 62 kg event at the 2020 Summer Olympics held in Tokyo, Japan. She also competed in the women's 63 kg event at the 2012 Summer Olympics, the first woman to wrestle for Kyrgyzstan in the Olympics. A legal dispute threatened to prevent Tynybekova from competing in London, but the case was delayed until after the Games. Tynybekova was eliminated in the 1/8 finals by Henna Johansson.

As of summer 2016, Tynybekova has competed in four World Championships (her highest finish being seventh in 2013) and four Asian Championships, finishing no lower than third and winning the 58 kg class in 2016.

In the 2016 Summer Olympics, Tynybekova won her octofinal and quarterfinal, then lost her semifinal to the eventual silver medalist, Russia's Valeria Koblova. She then lost the second bronze medal match to Sakshi Malik of India (see Wrestling at the 2016 Summer Olympics – Women's freestyle 58 kg).

On 13 May 2017, Aisuluu Tynybekova received a gold medal in the Asian champion in 2017 (New Delhi, India). On 23 August 2017, she received bronze medal at the 2017 World Championships in Paris, France, by defeating Ms. Rong Ningning (China), in 58 kg wrestling.

In 2020, she won the gold medal in the 62 kg event at the 2020 Individual Wrestling World Cup held in Belgrade, Serbia.

Personal life 
Aisuluu Tynybekova was born the 4th of May, 1993, in the village of Mailuu-Suu in the Jalal-Abad oblast in the South-Western part of Kyrgyzstan. At 15, Tynybekova discovered the sport of freestyle wrestling, and four years later she became the first woman to wrestle for Kyrgyzstan in the Olympics.

Prior to her career in wrestling, she played basketball and trained in the martial art karate. In 2009, she joined the Kyrgyz national wrestling team and as soon as 2013 she was named one of the Best Athletes of the Year in Kyrgyzstan. Additionally, she held the title of Master of Sport of International Class in Kyrgyzstan in 2015. She also studied economics at the Kyrgyz State Technical University in Bishkek.

Career 
Aisuluu started her international wrestling career in the year 2009. She went on to become Asian Junior and Cadet championship.

2012

2012 London Olympics 
In 2012 she became the first ever female wrestler from Kyrgyzstan to qualify for Olympics by winning Silver medal at Asian Olympic qualification tournament in the 63 kg women freestyle wrestling event. She was eliminated from the tournament by Henna Johansson. Later in the year she went on to win Bronze at the Spain Open held in Madrid.

2013 
Aisuluu came back stronger from the Olympic loss in the year 2013. She won the bronze medal in the 59 kg category. Later in the year she proceeded to win bronze at Klippan Ladies Open in Sweden. This was followed by her competing in World Wrestling Championship in Budapest, Hungary. She won defeated her opponents in round of 32 and round of 16 only to be stopped by eventual silver medalist Taybe Yusein. As Yusein reached finals she got the opportunity to compete for bronze medal. However, she was eliminated by Tetyana Lavrenchuk in repechage round 2. In this year she was also named as the best Female Athlete of Kyrgyzstan.

2014 
2014 turned out to be an important year for Aisuluu. She started the Years campaign in at Asian wrestling championship in Astana and won the silver medal there. She in the tournament defeated Japanese opponent Haruka Sato. She however, failed to win the gold medal because as she lost to Zhang Lan of China in the finals. This was followed by a silver at Grand Prix of Germany before entering the world championship. There she was eliminated in the round of 16 by Alli Ragan of the US.

Asian Games 2014 
After losing the opening round to eventual Silver medalist, Sündeviin Byambatseren, she proceeded to win the bronze medal in the repechage rounds by defeating Jong In-sun.

2015 
Aisuluu continued her strong performance following Asian Games. In 2015 she won a silver medal at the Ivan Yarygin Grand Prix. This was followed by her repeating her silver medal at the Asian Championship in 2015 after losing to 10-time-world champion Kaori Icho in finals. She produced strong performances in Spain and Golden Grand prix by winning silver in each. In the 2015 world championship she was defeated in the first round by eventual silver medalist Petra Olli. As Olli reached finals, Aisuluu got repechage rounds. She won the first round against Michelle Fazzari but lost to Johanna Mattsson in the next round.

2016 
Aisuluu had a fiery opening in 2016. She came in her strongest form as she won the gold medal at the 2016 Asian Championship. This was followed by another strong gold at the FILA Asian Olympic Qualification Tournament. She before entering the Olympics won a silver at the Poland Open.

2016 Rio Olympics 
Aisuluu was a medal prospect for her country at the Rio Games. She defeated Joice Silva in round of 16 and Petra Olli in round of 8 before losing to Valeria Koblova in the semi-final. She got her chance to win bronze medal but lost to Sakshi Malik.

2020 

In 2020, she won the gold medal in the women's 62 kg event at the 2020 Individual Wrestling World Cup held in Belgrade, Serbia.

2021 

In 2021, she won the gold medal in her event at the 2021 Poland Open held in Warsaw, Poland.

Aisuluu Tynybekova takes Silver Medal in the women's 62 kg, becoming the first-ever woman from Kyrgyzstan to win a silver medal at the Olympic Games.

2022 

In 2022, she competed at the Yasar Dogu Tournament held in Istanbul, Turkey. She won the gold medal in the 62 kg event at the 2021 Islamic Solidarity Games held in Konya, Turkey. She lost her bronze medal match in the 62kg event at the 2022 World Wrestling Championships held in Belgrade, Serbia.

2023 

She won the gold medal in her event at the 2023 Ibrahim Moustafa Tournament held in Alexandria, Egypt.

References

External links
 
 https://unitedworldwrestling.org/match?options[nodeId]=3067&options[arenaId]=c8abf31c-874f-11e7-b4ee-0800275a62ce 
 https://unitedworldwrestling.org/event/asian-championships-0#&gid=1&pid=42 
 https://www.azattyk.org/a/28693174.html?nocache=1 (in Kyrgyz) 
 https://24.kg/sport/51652_aysuluu_tyinyibekova_chempionka_azii_poborbe/ (in Russian)
 

1993 births
Living people
Kyrgyzstani female sport wrestlers
Olympic wrestlers of Kyrgyzstan
Wrestlers at the 2012 Summer Olympics
Wrestlers at the 2016 Summer Olympics
Sportspeople from Bishkek
Asian Games medalists in wrestling
Wrestlers at the 2010 Asian Games
Wrestlers at the 2014 Asian Games
Wrestlers at the 2018 Asian Games
Universiade medalists in wrestling
Central Asia
Medalists at the 2014 Asian Games
Medalists at the 2018 Asian Games
Asian Games silver medalists for Kyrgyzstan
Asian Games bronze medalists for Kyrgyzstan
Universiade medalists for Kyrgyzstan
World Wrestling Championships medalists
Medalists at the 2013 Summer Universiade
Asian Wrestling Championships medalists
Islamic Solidarity Games medalists in wrestling
Islamic Solidarity Games competitors for Kyrgyzstan
Wrestlers at the 2020 Summer Olympics
Medalists at the 2020 Summer Olympics
Olympic medalists in wrestling
Olympic silver medalists for Kyrgyzstan
21st-century Kyrgyzstani women